Drăghiceşti may refer to:

Drăghiceşti,  a village in Săpata Commune, Argeș County, Romania
Drăghiceşti, a village in Cosminele Commune, Prahova County, Romania